Lennox Tower is a ruined fifteenth-century tower house at Lymphoy, near the Water of Leith, between Balerno and Currie,  south-west of Edinburgh, Scotland.

History

The tower was built by the Earls of Lennox, who belonged to the Stewart family. It was known as "Lumphoy" or "Lymphoy." Mary, Queen of Scots and Regent Morton visited the castle, while James VI used it as a base for hunting. He dined there on 18 April 1598. It was later acquired by George Heriot, the goldsmith and founder of George Heriot's School. The castle became so ruinous that at one stage it became a rock garden.

Description

The castle was a rectangular tower. The only part remaining is the basement, the entrance of which is in the north-east corner, and the base of a turnpike stair.

There was a tunnel from the building to Lymphoy House. The castle is on a promontory.  There is a ditch to the south of this, about two metres deep, where an inner rampart may have been.  It is thought that a barmkin once surrounded the site, while other buildings probably stood between the tower and the ditch.

Tradition

The tower is said to be haunted by a white lady.  The tradition is that she is the daughter-in-law of the family at Lymphoy House.  After her husband died in battle she turned to his family, who had never approved of her, for help.  When they rejected her she, and her child, died in the snow. A white lady has been seen gliding around the area several times since.

Related websites
Photograph of Lennox Tower

References

Houses completed in the 15th century
Towers completed in the 15th century
Castles in Edinburgh
Category B listed buildings in Edinburgh
Listed castles in Scotland
15th century in Scotland
Reportedly haunted locations in Edinburgh